The Ministry of Agriculture, Natural Resources and Rural Development is a ministry of the Government of Haiti. 

This ministry is responsible for Agriculture, Natural Resources and Rural Development along with playing an integral role in the Prime Minister's Cabinet.

See also
 

Government ministries of Haiti